Liebenstein Castle is a castle above the village of Kamp-Bornhofen in Rhineland-Palatinate, Germany.

Notes and references

Sources and external links

Official website
 3d-view of the castle at Sketchfab and Altizure

Liebenstein (Rhein)
Rhein-Lahn-Kreis